South Laurel is an unincorporated area and census-designated place (CDP) in Prince George's County, Maryland, United States. Per the 2020 census, the population was 29,602.

Geography
South Laurel is located at  (39.072741, −76.851007).

Demographics

2020 census

Note: the US Census treats Hispanic/Latino as an ethnic category. This table excludes Latinos from the racial categories and assigns them to a separate category. Hispanics/Latinos can be of any race.

2010 Census

As of the census of 2000, there were 20,479 people, 8,260 households, and 5,055 families residing in the CDP. The racial makeup of the CDP was 38.68% White, 49.70% African American, 0.19% Native American, 5.61% Asian, 0.03% Pacific Islander, 2.55% from other races, and 3.23% from two or more races. Hispanic or Latino of any race were 5.26% of the population.

There were 8,260 households, out of which 33.6% had children under the age of 18 living with them, 38.6% were married couples living together, 17.2% had a female householder with no husband present, and 38.8% were non-families. 30.0% of all households were made up of individuals, and 5.1% had someone living alone who was 65 years of age or older. The average household size was 2.45 and the average family size was 3.06.

In the CDP, the population was spread out, with 26.2% under the age of 18, 10.0% from 18 to 24, 38.4% from 25 to 44, 18.5% from 45 to 64, and 6.8% who were 65 years of age or older. The median age was 31 years. For every 100 females, there were 90.9 males. For every 100 females age 18 and over, there were 86.6 males.

The median income for a household in the CDP was $51,043, and the median income for a family was $60,028. Males had a median income of $38,559 versus $32,068 for females. The per capita income for the CDP was $24,564. About 3.5% of families and 5.9% of the population were below the poverty line, including 8.9% of those under age 18 and 3.0% of those age 65 or over.

Government and infrastructure
The U.S. Postal Service operates the Montpelier Post Office in South Laurel CDP.

Education

Primary and secondary schools
South Laurel CDP is served by schools in the Prince George's County Public Schools.

Zoned elementary schools serving sections of the CDP include: Deerfield Run, James Harrison, Laurel, Montpelier, Oaklands, and Vansville.

Most residents are zoned to Dwight D. Eisenhower Middle School in South Laurel while some are zoned to Martin Luther King Middle School in Beltsville. All residents are zoned to Laurel High School in Laurel.

Colleges and universities
Capitol Technology University is in South Laurel, on the site of the former Beltsville Speedway (a.k.a. Baltimore-Washington Speedway).

References

Census-designated places in Prince George's County, Maryland
Census-designated places in Maryland